Traugott Bernhard Zwar (20 June 1876 – 16 January 1947) was an Australian academic, army medical officer and surgeon. He was born in Stockwell, South Australia, Australia and died in Malvern, Melbourne, Victoria, Australia. He was a founder of the Royal Australasian College of Surgeons.

See also

 Albert Michael Zwar
 Sir John Greig Latham
 Walter Russell Hall
 Charles Arthur Wheeler

References

Academic staff of the University of Melbourne
Australian military doctors
Australian military personnel of World War I
Australian surgeons
Australian people of German descent
1876 births
1947 deaths
Fellows of the Royal Australasian College of Surgeons
People of Sorbian descent